Ahmad Ibrahim Kulliyyah of Laws (AIKOL) is the law faculty of International Islamic University Malaysia. Previously known as the Kulliyyah of Laws, it was renamed in 2000 in honour of its founding father and ex-Dean, professor Ahmad Mohamed Ibrahim. Being the first Kulliyyah (faculty) to be formed together with the university, it is now one of the largest law schools in Malaysia and has produced thousands of law graduates since 1983: legal practitioners, shariah lawyers, academicians, legal advisors, deputy public prosecutors, judiciary members, ministers and politicians. The current Dean is Professor Dr. Farid Sufian bin Shuaib.

Due to its international status, the medium for teaching in AIKOL is English and Arabic. However, Bahasa Melayu is also taught to students to equip them with the understanding of legal jargons in the national language. It does receive a small group of foreign law students every year whilst the majority of the students are Malaysians.

Courses offered

AIKOL offers a variety of courses ranging from LL.B (Honours), LL.B-S (Honours) for Shariah law students, MCL (Master of Comparative Laws) and up to PhD (Doctor of Philosophy) level. It also provides for programmes like Diploma in Shariah Law And Practice (DSLP) and Diploma in Law and Administration of Islamic Judiciary (DAIJ). Under the Legal Profession Act 1976, a person who has been awarded an LL.B (Honours) degree from AIKOL of IIUM is recognised as a 'qualified person' that may be admitted as an Advocate & Solicitor in the High Court, Malaysia, and is exempted from taking the Certificate of Legal Practice (Malaysia).

Harun M. Hashim Law Centre of AIKOL offers several programmes, including LL.M Business Law, LL.M Islamic Banking & Finance Law, LL.M in Administration of Islamic Law and LL.M in International Law. In addition, it also offers certificate programmes in Company Secretarial Practice, Competition Policy Law, and Islamic Banking & Finance Law.

Events

The Ahmad Ibrahim Memorial Lecture series is conducted annually by inviting experts and scholars to speak on diverse legal issues. The eminent speakers previously invited to speak in the event include Tun Salleh Abas, Tun Zaki Azmi, Tun Abdul Hamid Mohamad, Richard Malanjum, Gordon Woodman, Andrew Harding, Mohamad Ariff Yusof, and Rais Yatim.

IIUM Mock Trial is an annual theatrical play conducted by the Law Society of AIKOL, traditionally held during the Convocation Week commonly known as Convest, at the AIKOL Moot Court or the IIUM Main Auditorium. Students would reenact famous legal trials, with added dramatic elements like humour, suspense, horror and patriotism, as well as extensive stage props, costumes and gimmicks. Among the real cases that have been chosen for the IIUM Mock Trial in the past include Mona Fandey, Maria Hertogh, Botak Chin and Al-Ma'unah.

Publications
The IIUM Law Journal is a peer-reviewed journal, published twice a year by AIKOL, with a dedicated mission of ideas and information about legal developments relating to civil and Shariah laws.

The Law Majalla is the first student-run law journal in Malaysia. It was published in 1985 as a way for the students of the AIKOL to contribute to the ever-growing body of legal scholarship. The Law Society of AIKOL is also in charge of the student-run newsletter called The Lexicon.

AIKOL professors and lecturers have published numerous books via IIUM Press, the university's press, on various legal areas including Islamic banking and finance law, family law, international law, environmental law, dispute resolution and contract law.

Achievements
AIKOL actively participates in various public speaking, debating, client counseling and mooting competitions, both nationally and internationally. 

Irma Nur Zahrah of AIKOL became the first Asian to win the public speaking competition at the World Universities Debating Championships 2004 held at Nanyang Technological University, Singapore.
One of AIKOL's major achievements was when it became the runner-up in the prestigious Philip C. Jessup International Law Moot Court Competition 2005 held at Washington, D.C. and Melati Abdul Hamid was awarded the Best Oralist in the Championship Round. Another major achievement was in 2008, where the IIUM mooting team represented Malaysia and managed to garner a clean sweep of the awards in the Inaugural Monroe E. Price Media Law Moot Court Competition held at University of Oxford. The IIUM team was crowned the inaugural champion, merited the Best Memorial Award and Best Oralist of the said competition.

Notable alumni

Academia
 Arif Fahmi bin Md Yusof, Dean, Faculty of Syariah and Law, Universiti Sains Islam Malaysia.
 Asmah Laili binti Yeon, Dean, College of Law, Government and International Studies, Universiti Utara Malaysia.
 Azmi Lila, Deputy Vice Chancellor (Research and Innovation), Universiti Putra Malaysia.
 Hartini Saripan, Dean, UITM Faculty of Law.
 Nazura Abdul Manap, Dean, Faculty of Law, National University of Malaysia.
 Noor Inayah Yaakub, President & Vice Chancellor, Infrastructure University Kuala Lumpur.
 Raihanah Abdullah, Dean, Humanities Research Cluster, Universiti Malaya.
 Sabirin Bin Ja'afar, Pro Chancellor, Universiti Teknikal Malaysia Melaka.
 Shahab Ahmed, Associate Professor of Islamic Studies, Harvard University.
 Zuhairah Ariff binti Abd Ghadas, Deputy Vice Chancellor (Academic and International), Universiti Sultan Zainal Abidin.

Business/Corporate
 Abdullah Shiham Hassan, Chairman, Bank of Maldives.
 Ahmad Nazim Abdul Rahman, CEO, Armed Forces Fund Board.
 Faisal Shahbudin, CEO, Jambatan Kedua Sdn Bhd.
 Maliki Kamal Mohd Yasin, Senior Vice President (Legal) and Company Secretary, Petronas.
 Pahamin Rajab, Founding Chairman, AirAsia and Secretary General, Ministry of Domestic Trade and Consumer Affairs (Malaysia).
 Rafe Haneef, CEO, CIMB Islamic.
 Suryani Senja Alias, Senior Vice President of Khazanah Nasional Berhad.

Executive
 Azalina Othman Said, Minister of Youth and Sports, Minister of Tourism, Minister in the Prime Minister's Department, Deputy Speaker of the Dewan Rakyat.
 Mastura Mohd Yazid, MP Kuala Kangsar, Perak and Deputy Minister in Prime Minister's Department (Special Functions).
 Mohamad Alamin, Deputy Minister of Education II. 
 Mohamed Hanipa Maidin, MP Sepang, Selangor, Deputy Minister in the Prime Minister's Department (Law).
 Noriah Kasnon, MP Sungai Besar, Selangor and Deputy Minister of Women, Family and Community Development.
 Rosnah Shirlin, Head of Puteri UMNO Malaysia, Deputy Minister of Health, and Deputy Minister of Works.
 Shamsul Iskandar Md. Akin, MP Hang Tuah Jaya, Melaka and Deputy Minister of Primary Industry.
 Syed Saddiq Syed Abdul Rahman, MP Muar, Johor, Minister of Youth and Sports.

Government/Agency
 Anas Ahmad Zakie, Director General of Insolvency.
 Dzulkifli Ahmad, Chief Commissioner, Malaysian Anti-Corruption Commission.
 Iskandar Ismail, CEO, Malaysia Competition Commission (MyCC).
 Marzuki Mohamad, Chairman, Institute for Youth Research Malaysia, and Principal Private Secretary to Prime Minister Muhyiddin Yassin.
 Mohd Khair Ngadiron, CEO, Malaysian Institute of Translation and Books.
 Wafi Nazrin bin Abdul Hamid, Chairman, Talent Corporation Malaysia Berhad (TalentCorp).
 Wirdati Mohd Radzi, Sports Commissioner of Malaysia.

Judiciary
 Alfian Kuchit, Senior President of Syariah Court Singapore.
 Cherno Jallow, Judge, Supreme Court of the Gambia, and Attorney General of the British Virgin Islands. 
 Hamid Sultan Abu Backer, the first Malaysian High Court Judge to receive a PhD in law and author of Janab's Key to Civil Procedure in Malaysia and Singapore.
 Mohd Naím Mokhtar, Chief Syarie Judge, Syariah Judiciary Department of Malaysia.
 Meor Hashimi Abdul Hamid, Judge, High Court of Malaya.
 Mohd Radzi Harun, Judge, High Court of Malaya.
 Rohana Yusuf, President, Court of Appeal of Malaysia.
 Sabirin Ja'afar, Judicial Commissioner, High Court of Malaya.

Legal
 Cherno Marenah, Solicitor General of the Gambia
 Hassan Saeed, Attorney-General of the Republic of Maldives.
 Husnu Al Suood, Attorney-General of the Republic of Maldives.
 Kuthubul Zaman Bukhari, President of the Malaysian Bar Council.
 Marie Saine-Firdaus, Attorney General of the Gambia.
 Zainul Rijal Abu Bakar, President of Muslim Lawyers Association, Malaysia.

Legislature
 Amira Aisya, State Assemblyman, Puteri Wangsa, Johor.
 Irmohizam Ibrahim, MP Kuala Selangor, Selangor.
 Fadlhlina Siddiq Fadzil, Senator.
 Fong Po Kuan, MP Batu Gajah, Perak.
 Khairiah Mohamed, Senator.
 Muhammad Faiz Fadzil, State Assemblyman Permatang Pasir, Pulau Pinang.
 Mohd Yusmadi Mohd Yusoff, MP Balik Pulau, Pulau Pinang and Senator.
 Mumtaz Md. Nawi, MP Kubang Kerian, State Assemblyman Demit, Kelantan, Senator.
 Terence Naidu, State Assemblyman Pasir Bedamar, Perak.
 Wong Kah Woh, State Assemblyman Canning, Perak.

Politics

 Kamilia Ibrahim, Vice Head of Wanita UMNO Malaysia.
 Khairil Annas Jusoh, Advisor to Prime Minister Najib Razak.
 Mohamed Jameel Ahmad, Vice President of the Maldives.

Royalty
 HRH Tengku Amalin A'ishah Putri, Kelantanese Princess and Magistrate officer.

Miscellaneous
 Azuan Effendy, Grand Chamberlain of the Royal Family and Household, Istana Negara, Jalan Duta.
 Engku Rabiah Adawiah Engku Ali, first female member of Shariah Advisory Council of Bank Negara Malaysia, Shariah Advisory Board of Khazanah Nasional Berhad and world's first registered female Islamic finance Shariah advisor.
 Farrah Adeeba Mohamed Ashraf, TV personality.
 Ismail Omar, Inspector General of Police, Royal Malaysian Police.
 Jufitri Joha, President, Malaysian Youth Council.
 Khalid Abu Bakar, Inspector General of Police, Royal Malaysian Police.
 Miszairi Sitiris, Deputy Mufti of Selangor.
 Wan Ahmad Najmuddin, Director of Crime Investigation Department, Royal Malaysian Police.

Notable faculty members (current and former)
 Ahmad Mohamed Ibrahim, Attorney-General of Singapore and Dean of Faculty of Law, Universiti Malaya.
 Abdul Aziz Bari, Perak State Exco and constitutional scholar.
 Harun Mahmud Hashim, judge who banned UMNO.
 Hunud Abia Kadouf, judge, Court of Appeal of Sudan.
 Md Hashim Yahya, Mufti of Wilayah Persekutuan.
 Mohammad Hashim Kamali, internationally renowned Islamic jurist.
 Mohd Akram Shair Mohamed, member of the Kuala Lumpur War Crimes Commission.
 Mohd Daud Bakar, President of International Islamic University Malaysia and member of HSBC's Global Shariah Advisory Board.
 Nik Norzrul Thani, Chairman of Zaid Ibrahim & Co., the largest law firm in Malaysia.
 Rusni Hassan, member of Shariah Advisory Council, Bank Negara Malaysia.
 Shad Saleem Faruqi, constitutional scholar.
 Suleiman Abdullah, President of the Malaysian Bar Council.
 Syed Agil Barakbah, Supreme Court Judge of Malaysia.
 Yusri Mohamad, President of Angkatan Belia Islam Malaysia (ABIM).
 Zaleha Kamarudin, Rector of International Islamic University Malaysia.

See also
 International Islamic University Malaysia

References

External links
 Official Website of Ahmad Ibrahim Kulliyyah Of Laws
 Official Website of Harun M. Hashim Law Centre

Faculties of the International Islamic University Malaysia
Law schools in Malaysia
Educational institutions established in 1983
1983 establishments in Malaysia